National Association for Women's Suffrage may refer to:

 National Association for Women's Suffrage (Denmark)
 National Association for Women's Suffrage (Norway)
 National Association for Women's Suffrage (Sweden)